Modern Stochastics: Theory and Applications is a quarterly peer-reviewed open-access mathematics journal that was established in 2014. It is published cooperatively by Vilnius University (Lithuania), Taras Shevchenko National University of Kyiv (Ukraine), and VTeX (Lithuania). The editors-in-chief are Kestutis Kubilius (Vilnius University) and Yuliya Mishura (Taras Shevchenko National University of Kyiv). The journal covers all aspects of stochastics.

Abstracting and indexing
The journal is abstracted and indexed in:
Current Index to Statistics
Emerging Sources Citation Index
MathSciNet
Scopus
Zentralblatt MATH

References

External links

Statistics journals
Probability journals
English-language journals
Creative Commons Attribution-licensed journals
Quarterly journals
Publications established in 2014
Vilnius University
Taras Shevchenko National University of Kyiv